Willi Schulz (born 4 October 1938) is a German former footballer who played as a defender for Schalke 04 and Hamburger SV. At International level, he made 66 appearances for the West Germany national team.

Career 
Schulz was born in Wattenscheid, Germany. He played his first of altogether 66 games for West Germany in 1959 at a time when he was still an amateur for lower league club Union Günnigfeld. In 1960 he joined FC Schalke 04, spending the first three years in the Oberliga West, and in 1963 the Bundesliga was officially created. In 1965 he changed outfit joining Hamburger SV.

Schulz started out as a right half back in the late 1950s. With the change from the WM system to the 4–2–4, Schulz was converted from half back to stopper by the mid-1960s. During the 1966 World Cup, Schulz acted as the sweeper of the West Germany national team, a role he had taken over from Klaus-Dieter Sieloff only shortly before the tournament. At that tournament, Schulz was rated as one of the best defenders. During the next four years, Schulz remained the standard sweeper of West Germany. During this time, Schulz was acknowledged as one of the best central defenders in global football. In November 1968, he was part of the FIFA XI that faced Brazil in Rio de Janeiro.

Schulz would have been the standard sweeper of West Germany during the 1970 World Cup, but an injury of the meniscus as well as a calf bruise meant that he only started in two of the six World Cup games in Mexico. In his place, Karl-Heinz Schnellinger played as sweeper. After the 1970 World Cup, Schulz retired from international activities. He continued to play for Hamburger SV until 1973.

Playing style 
Being a conservative sweeper with no urge to join the attack of his teams, Schulz focused on marshalling his defense. He was noted for his calmness even under pressure, his positional play, his strength at man-to-man duels, his solid passing game, aerial ability and a special expertise at sliding tackling. For these traits as well as his consistency at the top level, Schulz was revered by West Germany national team coach Helmut Schön, who preferred Schulz at the sweeper position to the younger and more adventurous Franz Beckenbauer, who had to play in midfield instead.

Career after football 
After his retirement, Schulz established an insurance agency in Hamburg and also engaged in the slot machine business. During the 1970s and 1980s, Schulz was also known for his critical sport columns for Hamburg newspapers. After the 1982 FIFA World Cup match between West Germany and Austria, in which the two sides colluded to allow West Germany to win 1–0 enabling both sides to progress at the expense of Algeria, Schulz famously called the West Germany players "gangsters".

Honours
 1966 FIFA World Cup runner-up
 1970 FIFA World Cup 3rd place
 UEFA Cup Winners' Cup finalist: 1967–68
 DFB-Pokal finalist: 1966–67

References

External links
 
 
 

German footballers
Germany international footballers
Germany B international footballers
FC Schalke 04 players
Hamburger SV players
Bundesliga players
1962 FIFA World Cup players
1966 FIFA World Cup players
1970 FIFA World Cup players
1938 births
Living people
Sportspeople from Bochum
Association football central defenders
Association football sweepers
Footballers from North Rhine-Westphalia
West German footballers